Andrei Vladimirovich Yevdokimov (born 9 March 1999) is a Russian football player. He plays for FC Torpedo Moscow and FC Torpedo-2.

Club career
He made his debut in the Russian Professional Football League for FC Khimki-M on 13 October 2018 in a game against FC Kaluga.

He made his Russian Football National League debut for FC Khimki on 12 October 2019 in a game against FC Mordovia Saransk.

Honours
Torpedo Moscow
 Russian Football National League : 2021-22

References

External links
 Profile by Russian Football National League
 
 

1999 births
Living people
Russian footballers
Association football defenders
FC Khimki players
FC Torpedo Moscow players